Paulo Sevciuc (born 27 November 1943) is a Brazilian former volleyball player who competed in the 1972 Summer Olympics. He played on the team which won a silver medal at the 1967 Pan American Games.

References

1943 births
Living people
Brazilian men's volleyball players
Olympic volleyball players of Brazil
Volleyball players at the 1972 Summer Olympics
Volleyball players at the 1967 Pan American Games
Pan American Games silver medalists for Brazil
Place of birth missing (living people)
Pan American Games medalists in volleyball
Medalists at the 1967 Pan American Games